Hypothyris lycaste is a species of butterfly of the family Nymphalidae. It is found in Central and northern South America.

The larvae of ssp. callispila feed on Solanum torvum.

Subspecies
Hypothyris lycaste lycaste (Panama, Colombia)
Hypothyris lycaste mergelena (Hewitson, [1855]) (Colombia)
Hypothyris lycaste dionaea (Hewitson, [1854]) (Mexico, Guatemala)
Hypothyris lycaste callispila (Bates, 1866) (Costa Rica, Panama)
Hypothyris lycaste antonia (Hewitson, 1869) (Ecuador)
Hypothyris lycaste glabra (Godman, 1899) (Colombia)
Hypothyris lycaste limpida (Haensch, 1905) (Colombia)
Hypothyris lycaste fraterna (Haensch, 1909) (Venezuela)
Hypothyris lycaste limosa Fox, 1971 (Colombia)

In addition, there is one unnamed subspecies from Panama.

References

Butterflies described in 1793
Ithomiini
Nymphalidae of South America
Taxa named by Johan Christian Fabricius